Yingzhou or Ying Prefecture was a zhou (prefecture) in imperial China in modern Shanxi, China, seated in modern Ying County. It existed (intermittently) from the 9th century until 1912.

It was one of the Sixteen Prefectures.

Geography
The administrative region of Yingzhou in the Tang dynasty falls within modern northern Shanxi. It probably includes parts of modern: 
 Under the administration of Shuozhou
 Ying County
 Shanyin County
 Under the administration of Datong
 Hunyuan County

References
 

Former prefectures in Shanxi
Sixteen Prefectures
Prefectures of the Tang dynasty
Prefectures of Later Tang
Prefectures of the Liao dynasty
Prefectures of the Jin dynasty (1115–1234)
Prefectures of the Yuan dynasty
Prefectures of the Ming dynasty
Prefectures of the Qing dynasty
9th-century establishments in China
1912 disestablishments in China